The Haitang Bay Circuit is a street circuit located in the Haitang Bay area of Sanya, in the Chinese island of Hainan. It is used for the Sanya ePrix of the single-seater, electrically powered Formula E championship. It was first used on 23 March 2019 for the 2019 Sanya ePrix.

Layout 
Prior to the inaugural race, it was decided to treat the track surface with a resin-type material, in a bid to prevent a repeat of the previous round in Santiago, which saw the track break up during the race due to the high temperatures.

Lap records 

The official race lap records at the Haitang Bay Circuit are listed as:

References 

Formula E circuits
Sanya
Motorsport venues in China